Revenge of the Zombies is a 1943 horror film directed by Steve Sekely, starring John Carradine and Gale Storm.  Dr. Max Heinrich von Altermann (John Carradine), is a mad scientist working to create a race of living dead warriors for the Third Reich.

The film was a follow-up to the horror-comedy King of the Zombies (1941) with Mantan Moreland reprising his role as Jeff and Madame Sul-Te-Wan returning as a different character.

Plot

After the death of Max's (John Carradine) wife Lila (Veda Ann Borg), he holds a funeral for her. However, he has also turned her into a zombie. He is amazed when Lila show signs of free will and challenges him for control. In the excitement Dr. Keating (Barry Macollum) goes missing after entering a tomb which should not have been entered.

During dinner, Scott Warrington (Mauritz Hugo) finds a radio in Max's cabinet, and figures out that it communicates to Hitler. Max learns of this and gags and ties up Scott. Lazarus (James Baskett), Max's right-hand man, finds a gun. While making soup with Rosella (Sybil Lewis), Jeff (Mantan Moreland) finds Scott bound and gagged in a closet, and he tells Jeff about the situation. Max discovers this and tries to flee the swamp. Lila and the hordes of zombies pursue Max, and both Max and Lila end up sinking into quicksand.

Cast
 John Carradine as Dr. Max Heinrich von Altermann
 Gale Storm as Jennifer Rand
 Robert Lowery as Larry Adams
 Bob Steele as United States agent posing as Sheriff
 Mantan Moreland as Jeff Jackson
 Veda Ann Borg as Lila von Altermann
 Barry Macollum as Dr. Harvey Keating
 Mauritz Hugo as Scott Warrington
 Madame Sul-Te-Wan as Mammy Beulah, the housekeeper
 James Baskett as Lazarus
 Sybil Lewis (actress) as Rosella
 Robert Cherry as Pete, a zombie
 Franklyn Farnum as zombie

Production
The film was a semi-remake of King of the Zombies. It was co-written by Edmond Kelso, who wrote the first film, and has a similar storyline: two men and a servant played by Mantan Moreland are guests in a strange house where a mad scientist with a zombie wife is working for Nazi Germany.

It was meant to star Bela Lugosi but Lugosi ended up not appearing. The movie was the first in a new six-film contract between Monogram and Moreland.

The film was announced in April 1943 with Robert Lowery and Mantan Moreland attached.

Filming was meant to start on 10 May 1943.  However this date was pushed back and John Carradine became the star.

Reception
Writing in The Zombie Movie Encyclopedia, Peter Dendle wrote that it is the first zombie film to presume that audiences know what a zombie is.  Dendle called it a remake of King of the Zombies and "stock fare from the Monogram horror mill."

References

External links

 
 
 
 
 

1943 films
1943 horror films
1940s comedy horror films
American zombie films
Monogram Pictures films
Films directed by Steve Sekely
American black-and-white films
Nazi zombie films
1940s English-language films
1940s American films